Curse Our Love is the debut album by alternative rock band Young Rebel Set. It was released in April 2011 under Big Flame Records.

The album received generally mixed reviews.

Track list

Charts

References

2011 debut albums